John  Young Wai (1847 – 21 June 1930) was an Australian Chinese community leader, Presbyterian lay leader and Presbyterian minister. Young Wai was born in Canton (Guangzhou), Guangdong, China and died in Summer Hill, Sydney, New South Wales.

References

Australian Presbyterians
Australian people of Chinese descent
1847 births
1930 deaths